Village of Greenwich Historic District is a national historic district located at Greenwich in Washington County, New York.  It includes 165 contributing buildings, six contributing sites (parks), one contributing structure, and 27 contributing objects.  It encompasses the historic center of the village including residential, commercial, civic, and ecclesiastical buildings as well as six memorial parks, including Monument Park containing the Civil War monument (1916).  The majority of the buildings were built between 1840 and 1900 and reflect a variety of 19th- and early-20th-century architectural styles.

It was listed on the National Register of Historic Places in 1995.

References

Historic districts on the National Register of Historic Places in New York (state)
Federal architecture in New York (state)
Historic districts in Washington County, New York
National Register of Historic Places in Washington County, New York